The following radio stations broadcast on AM frequency 1098 kHz.

China 
 CNR Tibetan Radio in Beijing and Golmud
 CNR Uyghur Radio in Beijing

Greece
"AMAX-385" at Athens (transmits AM stereo)

Japan
JOSR at Nagano, Nagano
JOSW at Iida, Nagano (A repeater of JOSR)
No callsign at Ina, Nagano (A repeater of JOSR)
JOWO at Kōriyama, Fukushima (A repeater of JOWR (Radio Fukushima))
JOGF at Ōita, Ōita
No callsign at Yufu, Ōita (A repeater of JOGF)

Marshall Islands
V7AB at Majuro

Netherlands
Golden Oldies Radio at Hoogvliet Rotterdam
Radio Gasselte at Gasselte
MasterFM at Nuland
Milano Team at Punthorst

Philippines
DWAD at Mandaluyong, Metro Manila

Thailand
"Sor. Wor. Thor." at Tambon Ban Phru (transmits AM stereo)

References

Lists of radio stations by frequency